In enzymology, an aryl-alcohol dehydrogenase is an enzyme that catalyzes the chemical reaction

an aromatic alcohol + NAD+  an aromatic aldehyde + NADH + H+

Thus, the two substrates of this enzyme are aromatic alcohol and NAD+, whereas its 3 products are aromatic aldehyde, NADH, and H+.

This enzyme belongs to the family of oxidoreductases, specifically those acting on the CH-OH group of donor with NAD+ or NADP+ as acceptor. The systematic name of this enzyme class is aryl-alcohol:NAD+ oxidoreductase. Other names in common use include p-hydroxybenzyl alcohol dehydrogenase, benzyl alcohol dehydrogenase, and coniferyl alcohol dehydrogenase. This enzyme participates in 5 metabolic pathways: tyrosine metabolism, phenylalanine metabolism, biphenyl degradation, toluene and xylene degradation, and caprolactam degradation.

Structural studies

As of late 2007, only one structure has been solved for this class of enzymes, with the PDB accession code .

References

 
 

EC 1.1.1
NADH-dependent enzymes
Enzymes of known structure